The spouse of the Taoiseach is the wife, husband or domestic partner of the Taoiseach of Ireland. The term "spouse of the Taoiseach" is not used in any official context. 

The spouse of the Taoiseach often plays a public role accompanying their husband/partner in their duties as head of government at public events.

List of spouses/partners

Notes

See also
List of spouses of the president of Ireland

References

 
Ireland